Fontbonne may refer to:

 Jeanne Fontbonne (1759–1843), known as Mother St. John, French Catholic sister
 Fontbonne University
 Fontbonne Academy
 Fontbonne Hall Academy
 Fontbonne transmitter of Radio Monte Carlo, known as the Col de la Madone transmitter